The OKI Open de Espana Senior by Cleveland Golf/Srixon was a men's senior (over 50) professional golf tournament on the European Senior Tour. It was held just once, in May 2011, at the El Valle Golf Resort, south of Murcia, Spain. The winner was Carl Mason who won the first prize of €30,000 out of total prize-money of €200,000.

Winners

External links
Coverage on the European Senior Tour's official site

Former European Senior Tour events
Golf tournaments in Spain
Recurring sporting events established in 2011
Recurring sporting events disestablished in 2011